Gurdev Singh (born 15 January 1948) is an Indian-born musician based in London who plays the plucked string instrument sarod. Singh studied under sarod player Amjad Ali Khan, can play the instrument dilruba, and sings Hindustani classical music. He performed on the 1993 album Fate of Nations by English rock singer Robert Plant. Singh has played internationally and taught students in England.

References

External links 

1948 births
Hindustani instrumentalists
Living people
Musicians from London
Sarod players